Ofir Kopel is a former Israeli footballer who played for Hapoel Petah Tikva and Maccabi Haifa.

Honours
Israel State Cup (1):
1992, 1998

References

1975 births
Living people
Israeli footballers
Hapoel Petah Tikva F.C. players
Maccabi Haifa F.C. players
Hapoel Kfar Saba F.C. players
Maccabi Petah Tikva F.C. players
Israel under-21 international footballers
Liga Leumit players
Israeli Premier League players
Israeli football managers
Footballers from Petah Tikva
Association football midfielders
Israel international footballers